Paradise Centre is a shopping centre located in Surfers Paradise, Queensland on the Gold Coast. It is located in the tourist district on Cavill Avenue and has stores selling a variety of goods.

History
Paradise Centre opened in December 1981, comprising a multi level shopping centre and two apartment buildings. In 2006, Paradise Centre was sold to Centro and rebranded as Centro Surfers Paradise. The two apartment buildings were sold to a different company. In 2012 Centro Surfers Paradise was sold to Challenger and the centre was rebranded back to Paradise Centre.

Shops
Paradise Centre comprises Woolworths (supermarket), the largest Timezone family amusement arcade centre in the world, a variety of restaurants, fast food restaurants and eclectic shops.

References

Shopping centres on the Gold Coast, Queensland
Shopping malls established in 1984
Surfers Paradise, Queensland
1984 establishments in Australia